Garbage theft is a colloquial term for the illegitimate removal of items from a dumpster, or other waste disposal container. Another colloquial phrase is dumpster diving.

Due to the typically low value of stolen items, in most countries garbage theft is not treated as a major crime, with the laws against theft of garbage often focused on preventing identity theft.

Garbage theft may be punishable as petty theft, with a penalty usually involving a minor prison sentence, a modest fine, or both, depending on the state or nation's laws regarding low-level theft.

History
Garbage theft has historically been used as a means of committing identity theft, with criminals using bank and credits card statements found in garbage to assume a person's identity or access their credit.

References

Theft